Francis Barber (1750–1783) was a colonel in the Continental Army during the American Revolutionary War. He was in the Sullivan Expedition and at the Siege of Yorktown with the 3rd New Jersey Regiment. He was wounded at the Battle of Monmouth and again at the Battle of Newton. He was killed in New Windsor, New York, where the army was camped in 1783, when a tree that was being cut fell on him as he was riding his horse to dine with George Washington in Newburgh, New York.

Elizabethtown Academy 
Barber was appointed headmaster of the classical prep school Elizabethtown Academy in 1771. His students included Alexander Hamilton and Aaron Burr.

References

External links 
Guide to the Francis Barber (1750-1783), Revolutionary War Officer Orderly Book 1779, New Jersey Historical Society. Retrieved June 16, 2009

People of New Jersey in the American Revolution
1750 births
1783 deaths